Montre Hartage (born June 16, 1997) is an American football safety who is a free agent. He played college football at Northwestern.

College career
Hartage was a member of the Northwestern Wildcats for four seasons. As a senior, he was named first-team All-Big Ten Conference by the media and to the third-team by the league's coaches after recording  51 tackles, 13 pass breakups, two interceptions and a fumble recovery. He finished his collegiate career with 172 total tackles, ten interceptions, and 39 passes defended.

Professional career

Miami Dolphins
Hartage was signed by the Miami Dolphins as an undrafted free agent on April 27, 2019. He was waived on August 31, 2019 as part of final roster cuts, but was re-signed to the team's practice squad. Hartage was promoted to the Dolphins' active roster on December 1 and made his NFL debut the same day against the Philadelphia Eagles. He was waived on December 3 and re-signed to the practice squad. He was promoted back to the active roster on December 14, 2019. Hartage was waived by the Dolphins on April 26, 2020.

New York Giants
Hartage was claimed off waivers by the New York Giants on April 28, 2020. He was waived/injured on September 5, 2020, and subsequently reverted to the team's injured reserve list the next day. He was waived with an injury settlement on September 10. He was re-signed to the Giants practice squad on October 27. He was elevated to the active roster on November 2 and November 7 for the team's weeks 8 and 9 games against the Tampa Bay Buccaneers and Washington Football Team, and reverted to the practice squad after each game. Hartage was promoted to the active roster on November 13. Hartage was waived on December 1, 2020, and re-signed to the practice squad two days later. On December 11, 2020, Hartage was signed to the active roster. On December 19, 2020, Hartage was waived by the Giants and re-signed to the practice squad three days later. He signed a reserve/future contract on January 4, 2021. He was waived/injured on August 24, 2021 and placed on injured reserve. He was released on September 2.

References

External links
Northwestern Wildcats bio

1997 births
Living people
American football defensive backs
Players of American football from Georgia (U.S. state)
People from Cordele, Georgia
Northwestern Wildcats football players
Miami Dolphins players
New York Giants players